Pentland Township is a civil township of Luce County in the U.S. state of Michigan.  As of the 2020 census, the township population was 1,564.

Geography

Transportation

Airports
 Luce County Airport is located within Pentland Township.

Major highways
  runs east–west through the center of the township.
  runs south–north through the western portion of the township and ends at M-28.
  runs north–south has its northern terminus within the township at M-28.  Because of the highway's angle, it is the "northern" terminus, even though it is running in a south direction.

Demographics
As of the census of 2000, there were 1,788 people, 693 households, and 516 families residing in the township.  The population density was 16.7 per square mile (6.5/km).  There were 825 housing units at an average density of 7.7 per square mile (3.0/km).  The racial makeup of the township was 88.70% White, 0.17% African American, 7.44% Native American, 0.11% Asian, 0.06% from other races, and 3.52% from two or more races. Hispanic or Latino of any race were 0.39% of the population.

There were 693 households, out of which 32.8% had children under the age of 18 living with them, 62.3% were married couples living together, 8.4% had a female householder with no husband present, and 25.5% were non-families. 21.9% of all households were made up of individuals, and 9.7% had someone living alone who was 65 years of age or older.  The average household size was 2.55 and the average family size was 2.95.

In the township the population was spread out, with 26.4% under the age of 18, 6.5% from 18 to 24, 27.6% from 25 to 44, 24.6% from 45 to 64, and 14.9% who were 65 years of age or older.  The median age was 39 years. For every 100 females, there were 100.4 males.  For every 100 females age 18 and over, there were 98.8 males.

The median income for a household in the township was $35,990, and the median income for a family was $37,991. Males had a median income of $34,583 versus $22,692 for females. The per capita income for the township was $16,352.  About 12.0% of families and 14.0% of the population were below the poverty line, including 20.3% of those under age 18 and 8.6% of those age 65 or over.

References

Townships in Luce County, Michigan
Townships in Michigan
1887 establishments in Michigan
Populated places established in 1887